Kyškovice is a municipality and village in Litoměřice District in the Ústí nad Labem Region of the Czech Republic. It has about 300 inhabitants.

It lies on the right bank of the Elbe River.

References

Villages in Litoměřice District